Iași National Athenaeum, also known as Tătărași Athenaeum, is a public cultural institution in Iași, Romania. It was founded on 25 April 1920, as Tătărași Popular Athenaeum, under the management of Constantin N. Ifrim.

The institution produces its own theatre performances, hosts various concerts, films, conferences, exhibitions and cultural events, and houses a public library.

References

External links

 Official website

Culture in Iași
Buildings and structures in Iași
Theatres in Iași
1920 establishments in Romania
Event venues established in 1920
Theatres completed in 2003